Celestial Pictures is a diversified entertainment company focusing on Asian-language film and television content including production, aggregation, distribution and the operation of TV channels.

Headquartered in Hong Kong, the company owns the world's largest Chinese film collection including the Shaw Brothers film library. Celestial Pictures is restoring the Shaw Brothers' movies and distributing them to cinemas and the worldwide television and home video markets.

History
It purchased the Shaw Brothers film library in 2000, when it was then called "East Asia Filmed Entertainment Ltd" and owned by the Malaysian media group Astro Holdings Sdn Bhd, which in turn controlled by Usaha Tegas Sdn Bhd (a Malaysian investment holding company). In 2001, under the Chinese name 星藝映畫, it produced two films, namely Comic King (漫畫風雲) and Stowaway (驚天大逃亡). It took up the current Chinese name 天映娛樂 in 2002.

Television channels
Celestial’s television channel operations include Celestial Movies; Celestial Movies Asia, which screens Japanese and Korean blockbusters; Celestial Classic Movies, which features Chinese classic films including the Shaw Brothers film collection; and WaTV, a Chinese infotainment channel dedicated to a new reflection of modern China. Also Shaw Bros. movies distributed by Celestial are shown in America on El Rey Network as part of its "Flying Five Finger One Armed Eight Pole Shaolin Exploding Death Touch Tuesdays" block.

Film and television content acquisition
Besides the library and TV networks, Celestial Pictures produces and acquires feature films and hundreds of hours of television programmes each year, including television dramas, children's programmes, animation and documentaries for their channels and worldwide distribution.

Celestial Pictures is a wholly owned subsidiary of Astro Overseas Ltd, owned by Astro Holdings Sdn Bhd.

References

 All The Content (2008), All The Content, Celestial Pictures to offer Mobile Content in Europe Inks Agreement with AllTheContent to Distribute Kung Fu Clips, retrieved on June 17, 2009, http://www.allthecontent.com/news/celestial-pictures-to-offer-mobile-content-in-europe-inks-agreement-with-allthecontent-to-distribute-kung-fu-clips.html
 Celestial Pictures (2002), Celestial Pictures Newsroom, Celestial Pictures Tributes Shaw Brothers Films At Gala Reception to Celebrate the Cinematic Re-release and Video Launch of the Shaw Brothers Movies, retrieved on June 17, 2009, http://www.celestialpictures.com/level3_recentnews.cfm?l_news_id=153
 Celestial Pictures (2002), Celestial Pictures Newsroom, Celestial Pictures presents Shaw Brothers Masterpieces Digitally Restored Press Conference, retrieved on June 17, 2009, http://www.celestialpictures.com/level3_recentnews.cfm?l_news_id=154
 Celestial Pictures (2003), Celestial Pictures Newsroom, Celestial Movies Launches the World's First Global 24-hour Chinese Movie Channel in Hong Kong on exTV, retrieved on June 17, 2009, http://www.celestialpictures.com/level3_recentnews.cfm?l_news_id=130
 Celestial Pictures (2004), Celestial Pictures Newsroom, Celestial Pictures' China-Content Infotainment Channel Launches in Southeast Asia, retrieved on June 17, 2009, http://www.celestialpictures.com/level3_recentnews.cfm?l_news_id=122
 Celestial Pictures (2009), Celestial Pictures Newsroom, retrieved on June 17, 2009, https://web.archive.org/web/20090731115720/http://www.celestialpictures.com/level2_newsroom.cfm
 Hong Kong Cinema (2009), Hong Kong Cinema - Shaw Brothers News - Celestial, retrieved on June 17, 2009, http://www.hkcinema.co.uk/Articles/shawbronewsq12002.html
Information Services Department, Hong Kong Special Administrative Region Government, Celestial Pictures Limited donates film library to HK Film Archive (with photos), retrieved June 17, 2009, http://www.info.gov.hk/gia/general/200904/30/P200904300175.htm
 Mark Pollard, Kung Fu Cinema (2009), Celestial Pictures: Kung Fu Cinema, retrieved on June 17, 2009, http://www.kungfucinema.com/tag/celestial-pictures
 Mark Pollard, Kung Fu Cinema (2009), Celestial Pictures: Kung Fu Cinema, Celestial donates Shaw library to HK Film Archive, retrieved on June 17, 2009, http://www.kungfucinema.com/celestial-donates-shaw-library-to-hk-film-archive-6972
 Mark Pollard, Kung Fu Cinema (2009), Celestial Pictures: Kung Fu Cinema, Shaw films leave U.S. and head to Russia, retrieved on June 17, 2009, http://www.kungfucinema.com/shaw-films-pack-up-in-us-and-head-to-russia-4361
 
 
 
 
 
 
 Screen International (2007), Screen International, Celestial Pictures launches kung-fu mobile TV channel, retrieved on June 17, 2009, http://www.screendaily.com/celestial-pictures-launches-kung-fu-mobile-tv-channel/4033356.article

External links
 Celestial Pictures - Official Website
 CELESTIAL MOVIES - Official Website
 CELESTIAL MOVIES ASIA - Official Website
 CELESTIAL CLASSIC MOVIES - Official Website
 Celestial Tiger Entertainment - Official Website
 China Travel

Astro Malaysia Holdings
Film production companies of Hong Kong
Television production companies
Mass media companies established in 2000
Mass media companies disestablished in 2011